Barbodes manalak, known locally as the manalak, is an extinct species of cyprinid fish endemic to Lake Lanao in Mindanao, the Philippines. It was black on the top of the head and snout with a wide, short snout. It was dark green on the dorsum, white on the sides with a gold tint especially heavy on the belly.  Fins were pale colored with a dark green dorsal fin.  This species reached a length of  TL.  It was important to local subsistence fisheries.

References

Barbodes
Freshwater fish of the Philippines
Endemic fauna of the Philippines
Fauna of Mindanao
Fish described in 1924
Taxonomy articles created by Polbot